The 2012–13 Tulane Green Wave men's basketball team represented Tulane University during the 2012–13 NCAA Division I men's basketball season. The Green Wave, led by third year head coach Ed Conroy, played their home games at Devlin Fieldhouse and were members of Conference USA. They finished the season 20–15, 6–10 in C-USA play to finish in three way tie for ninth place. They lost in the quarterfinals of the Conference USA tournament to Memphis. They were invited to the 2013 CIT where they defeated South Alabama in the first round before losing in the second round to Bradley.

Roster

Schedule

|-
!colspan=9| Regular season

|-
!colspan=9| 2013 Conference USA men's basketball tournament

|-
!colspan=9| 2013 CIT

References

Tulane Green Wave men's basketball seasons
Tulane
Tulane
Tulane
Tulane